Munay is the name of a village in Ras Al Khaimah, one of the United Arab Emirates. It sits at the head of the Wadi Qor.

References

Populated places in the Emirate of Ras Al Khaimah